Abū ʿAlī Muḥammad ibn ʿUbayd Allāh al-Khāqānī was a senior official of the Abbasid Caliphate, who served as vizier from 912 to 913.

He was the son of the distinguished Ubayd Allah ibn Yahya ibn Khaqan, who served twice as vizier, under the caliphs al-Mutawakkil and al-Mu'tamid. The famous historian al-Tabari was his tutor, reportedly being paid ten gold dinars a month. A rival of Ali ibn al-Furat, he succeeded the latter as vizier to Caliph al-Muqtadir in July 912, and remained in office until August 913. His tenure was marked by attempts to shore up finances through imposing heavy fines to dismissed officials of the Banu'l-Furat faction, and by a pro-Hanbali stance that led to anti-Shi'ite measures. After his dismissal, he was imprisoned by his successor Ali ibn Isa al-Jarrah, and by his rival Ibn al-Furat when the latter became again vizier in 917. He died in 924/5. His son Abdallah also served briefly as vizier in 924–925.

References

Sources
 
 

924 deaths
10th-century people from the Abbasid Caliphate
Viziers of the Abbasid Caliphate
Prisoners and detainees of the Abbasid Caliphate
Year of birth unknown